"Feels in My Body" is a song by Swedish electropop duo Icona Pop. It was written by the duo along with Sarah Alison Solovay, Joe Janiak and the song's producers Nick Henriques and Milan D'Agostini. It was released on 7 August 2020, through TEN Music Group and Ultra Music.

Music video
The music video for "Feels in My Body", directed by Gustav Stegfors and Crille Forsberg, was released on YouTube on 7 August 2020.

Track listing

Credits and personnel
Credits adapted from Qobuz.
 Icona Pop – composing, vocals
 Sarah Alison Solovay - composing
 Nick Henriques - composing, producing
 Milan D'Agostini - composing, producing
 Joe Janiak - composing
 Miles Walker - mixing

Charts

References

2020 singles
2020 songs
Icona Pop songs
Songs written by Aino Jawo
Ultra Music singles
Songs written by Caroline Hjelt
Songs written by Joe Janiak